Bayerotrochus indicus is a species of large sea snail, a marine gastropod mollusk in the family Pleurotomariidae, the slit snails.

Description
The shell grows to a length of 75 mm.

Distribution
This species occurs in the Andaman Sea.

References

 Anseeuw, P., 1999. Perotrochus indicus a new species of pleurotomariid from India. Gloria Maris 37(5-6): 88-95

External links
 To Encyclopedia of Life
 To World Register of Marine Species
 
 MNHN, Paris: holotype

Pleurotomariidae
Gastropods described in 1999